Church of the Sacred Heart of Jesus, Węgierki is a Roman Catholic church in Węgierki, Września County, Poland.

History 
The church was built between 1904-1907 by the followers of the Evangelical Augsburg Church. It was taken over by the Catholics after World War II. The dedication of the church took place on 16 May 1946. The parish was founded on October 1, 1969. The consecration of the church took place on 9 October 1997. A square tower was built on the side of the triangle-gabled nave. The nave is covered with a pyramid-shape roof. In the corner of the nave is a cylindrical extension constituting the staircase to the choir. The roof of the temple is covered with tiles. Next to the church is a cemetery.

Gallery

See also 
 Christian Church
 Roman Catholicism
 Roman Catholicism in Poland

Bibliography 
  Obiekty sakralne - Kościół pw. Najświętszego Serca Pana Jezusa
  Archidiecezja Gnieźnieńska - Kościół pw. Najświętszego Serca Pana Jezusa 

Wegierki
Gmina Września